Masafi Al-Shamal, is an Iraqi football team based in Baiji, Saladin, that plays in Iraq Division Three.

Managerial history
  Thiab Radhi
  Nasser Kamil

See also 
 2013–14 Iraq Division One
 2021–22 Iraq FA Cup

References

External links
 Masafi Al-Shamal SC on Goalzz.com
 Iraq Clubs- Foundation Dates

1992 establishments in Iraq
Association football clubs established in 1992
Football clubs in Saladin